"Wild Montana Skies" is a single from John Denver's 1983 album It's About Time, featuring vocals from Emmylou Harris. The song is often highly rated as a Western and Montana-themed song.

Reception
In 2010, the Western Writers of America rated "Wild Montana Skies" as one of the Top 100 Western songs of all time. In 2013, "Wild Montana Skies" won a poll as the "best song about Montana" run by the Great Falls Tribune.

Reception was not entirely positive; the New York Daily News rated the song as the second-worst song with the word "wild" in the title, second only to "Wildfire" by Michael Martin Murphey.

Chart performance

References

John Denver songs
Emmylou Harris songs
1983 singles